Ana Valeria Palacios Mendoza (born 16 February 1991), known as Valeria Palacios, is an Ecuadorian international footballer. She played for Ecuador at the 2015 FIFA Women's World Cup.

International career
Palacios represented Ecuador at the 2008 South American U-17 Women's Championship.

References

External links
 
 Profile  at FEF
 

1991 births
Living people
Women's association football midfielders
Ecuadorian women's footballers
People from Portoviejo
Ecuador women's international footballers
2015 FIFA Women's World Cup players
Pan American Games competitors for Ecuador
Footballers at the 2015 Pan American Games
21st-century Ecuadorian women